Rajiv Gandhi Institute of Medical Sciences may refer to 
Rajiv Gandhi Institute of Medical Sciences, Adilabad
Rajiv Gandhi Institute of Medical Sciences, Kadapa
Rajiv Gandhi Institute of Medical Sciences, Ongole
Rajiv Gandhi Institute of Medical Sciences, Srikakulam (now Government Medical College, Srikakulam)